{{DISPLAYTITLE:C22H25N3O}}
The molecular formula C22H25N3O (molar mass: 347.45 g/mol, exact mass: 347.1998 u) may refer to:

 Diallyllysergamide
 Indoramin
 PARGY-LAD

Molecular formulas